The Monte Arci is an isolated massif in the Uras plain in Campidano, south-western Sardinia, Italy. It is composed by three volcanic basalt towers, the highest one reaching an elevation of 812 m. The inner part of the massif is composed of trachyte.

Monte Arci is located just west of the Giara di Gesturi, a basaltic plateau.

Monte Arci had a relevant historical role in Sardinia due to the abundant presence of obsidian, which was used since prehistoric times for weapons and tools, and was later traded outside the island. There are also quarries of pearlite. In the territory of Morgongiori there are breeds of Giara horses. 

Arci